Puppetland: A Storytelling Game with Strings in a Grim World of Make-Believe is a role-playing game written by John Scott Tynes.

The game was first published in Arcane magazine issue 16 in early 1997, then later by Hogshead Publishing together with Powerkill, a satirical role-playing metagame by the same author, under the title Puppetland/Powerkill.

A free edition, including most of the game text is available on the author's web site.

New Style
Puppetland/Powerkill was part of a series experimental/alternative role-playing games published by Hogshead Publishing. Other games in the series included the award-nominated The Extraordinary Adventures of Baron Münchhausen, Pantheon, and Violence.

Kickstarter and New Edition 
In November 2014, an expanded version of Puppetland was successfully funded on Kickstarter, to be published by Arc Dream Publishing.

References

External links
 Official site
 Review by Ron Edwards
 Review by John H. Kim
 Various reviews from RPGnet 

British role-playing games
Horror role-playing games
Indie role-playing games
New Style
Role-playing games introduced in 1999